The Shimao Shenzhen–Hong Kong International Center is a vision -high megatall skyscraper that would be built in Shenzhen, China.

References 

Skyscrapers in Shenzhen
Buildings and structures under construction in China